Hamzeh Beygi (also Romanized as Ḩamzeh Beygī) is a village in Mashayekh Rural District, Doshman Ziari District, Mamasani County, Fars Province, Iran. At the 2006 census, its population was 220, in 53 families.

References 

Populated places in Mamasani County